Milajerd (also Romanized as Mīlājerd; also known as Mīl-ī-Jīrd) is a village in Chah Dasht Rural District, Shara District, Hamadan County, Hamadan Province, Iran. At the 2006 census, its population was 493, in 109 families.

References 

Populated places in Hamadan County